Jo Niemeyer (born in 1946 in Alf, Germany) is a concrete artist and designer. Niemeyer's work is based on the observation of nature through the use of mathematics and, especially, the "Golden Section". He has experimented with various media such as photography and film video, and today, he principally uses painting to compose his graphic works. Niemeyer also realized sculptural objects and big scale project such as the land art "20 steps around the world".

Biography 
Jo Niemeyer was born in 1946 in the German village Alf. He comes from a long-time artist family. His mother was a textile designer and worked in Saabrücken at the former State School for Art and Crafts, where she was in charge of a handloom weaving factory. His father began to paint at a relatively young age, in abstract and concrete art. Unfortunately, his paintings were considered to be degenerate and most of his works were destroyed or lost during WWII.

After three years of studying photography and graphic art, Niemeyer executed his first geometrical painting in 1966. He travelled in several countries, including the United States and Canada, and in Scandinavia where he was particularly fascinated by nature. In 1967, he pursued his training in industrial design at the Finnish Institute for Art "Atheneum". He decided in 1970 to quit his job as professional photographer to become a full-time independent artist.

In Finland, he met artist colleagues Lars-Gunnar Nordstrom and Matti Kujasalo, the former director of the Finnish Academy of Art in Helsinki. In the 80s, Kujasalo asked Niemeyer to lecture about different print techniques in the graphic art department. During this time, Niemeyer built up his knowledge of Finnish architecture. It was also in Helsinki in the late 60s that Niemeyer met his wife, Tuula Partanen. in 1972 she founded Edition Partanen which specialised in silkscreen prints and publication of graphic and art portfolios. The studio was established in South Germany with a showroom in Zurich, Switzerland. Edition Partanen collaborated with artists such as Rupprecht Geiger, Matti Kujasalo, Ilya Bolotowsky and Niemeyer himself.

Niemeyer began to elaborate his big scale project "20 steps around the world" which would be installed in 1997 in the City of Ropinsalmi in Finland. In this project, he  explained, the earth replaced the canvas. According to him, earth is the carrier of his artistic work being integrated into the creative process only by minimal changes. In the context of this work an arbitrarily defined route around the earth is divided systematically and exactly into 20 segments which develop to a dynamic, logarithmic progression according to the 'Golden Section'. The 20 steps are visualized by using an installation of 20 stainless-steel elements around the globe, precisely located on continents. The location of the points is achieved by using a computer and satellite navigation.

Over the years, Niemeyer has held successful one-man and group shows in Scandinavia, Italy, Switzerland, Israel, USA, England, Japan, Argentina, and Finland. His murals in public buildings can be found in countries all around the world including Switzerland and Germany, and in Scandinavia. Featured in numerous international publications and films, his works are in public and private collections and museums including in Japan, Germany, Canada, the Netherlands, Finland, Germany and Austria. Today, Jo Niemeyer works and lives in Germany, France and Finland.

Work 
From photography to painting

Niemeyer's interest in photography came from a fortunate encounter with photographer Otto Steinert, the former director of the Saarbrücken School where Niemeyer's mother used to work. The young Niemeyer was amazed by the way photographs were developed and chose to be trained as a photographer. Thanks to photography, Niemeyer realized that there are many ways to see things, and this medium was his first creative expression. He experimented with various techniques and specialized in architectural photography.

Niemeyer was interested in changeability of structure in photography, and the step forwards the free creation of such structure was a logical and natural one. Painting allows him to do so: creating a free composition of a picture.

From science (the study of the Nature) to concrete art

The essential element in Niemeyer's work is nature. Since childhood, he has loved skiing passionately and spend a considerable amount of time in the mountains. The images of snow, clouds and light-situations gave him the desire to study structure, space, movement and time.

In his work, Niemeyer connects art and nature, between the artistic action and the experimental work. His artistic production, fundamentally based on natural principals and measures, is nothing more than a sequence of experimental steps which implies given and objective criteria and subjective factors in the same way.

His work is based on events in nature and civilization as well as on communication with his colleagues of other disciplines. According to Niemeyer, the dual poles of nature and art are not only the basis of his experience but at the time also his central theme. His main interest is the perception of space, time, distances and proportion and forms the synthesis between art and nature which implies in the end a dialogue between man and nature. He considers land-art a kind of laboratory, a ground for experiments for aesthetic-artistic, political and ecological syntheses.

Literature 
 Matthias Diets: Lights, Benedikt Taschen Verlag, 1993
 Bernhard Holeczek: Von zwei Quadraten, Wilhelm-Hack-Museum, Ludwigshafen, 1987
 Dietmar Guderian: Mathematik in der Kunst der letzten 30 Jahre, Ebringen/Br. 1990.
 Alvar Aalto Museum: Graphica Creativa, Jyväskylä, 1990
 Kurt Naef: Der Spielzeugmacher / The Toymaker, Basel, 2006
 Arthur Ruegg: Schweizer Möbel und Interieurs im 20. Jahrhundert, Birkhäuser, 2002

Important Shows 
 2013 „Jo Niemeyer", Mathematikum Gießen.
 2009 Jo Niemeyer im Arithmeum Bonn
 2008 „Pure Abstract Art" Mondriaanhuis, Amersfoort/Niederlande.
 2008  "Hommage à Vordemberge-Gildewart", Kunsthalle Osnabrück.
 2005 „Experiment konkret 2005" Museum für konkrete Kunst Ingolstadt.
 2004 „konkrete Kunst aus Baden-Württemberg" Warschau.

Museums (selection) 
 Museum of Modern Art (MoMA), New York
 Pinakothek der Moderne, München
 Universität Tel Aviv, 
 Museum Pecs (Ungarn)
 Forum konkrete Kunst (Erfurt)
 Bauhaus Archiv (Berlin)
 Museum für konkrete Kunst (Ingolstadt)
 Stiftung für konkrete Kunst (Reutlingen)
 Museum Ushiroyama (Higashiawakura, Japan)
 Finnish National Gallery (Helsinki)
 Mondriaanhuis (Amersfoort/Niederlande)
 Nickle Arts Museum - University of Calgary
 Institut für konkrete Kunst (Rehau)

References

External links 
 Website der Edition Partanen über Jo Niemeyer
 DART, by Jo Niemeyer (Schluchsee, Germany) at the 2011 Mathematical Art Exhibition of the American Mathematical Society

20th-century German painters
20th-century German male artists
German male painters
21st-century German painters
21st-century German male artists
Modern painters
German contemporary artists
People from Cochem-Zell
1946 births
Living people